Tatabányai Vízmű Sportegyesület is a water polo club from Tatabánya, Hungary. The team competes in the Országos Bajnokság I.

Current team
Season 2016–2017

Bold: senior national team possess

Technical staff
  Head coach: Tamás Zantleitner

Squad changes for the 2015-16 season
In
 Dániel Francsics ( from PVSK )
 Károly Práczky ( from PVSK )
 László Jakab ( from MVLC )
 Attila Salamon ( from MVLC )
 Roland Tatár ( from BVSC )
 Áron Regős ( from Ferencváros )
 Stefan Živojinović ( from  Radnički )
 Máthé Balázs ( from  )
Out

Recent seasons

Rankings in OB I

Coaches
 Tamás Zantleitner (2015 – present)

References

External links
 

Water polo clubs in Hungary
Tatabánya
Sports clubs established in 1910
1910 establishments in Hungary